Dame Karen Elisabeth Dind Jones, Mrs Easton  (born 29 July 1956) is a British business executive.

Jones was educated at the University of East Anglia (BA, 1978) and went on to study at Wellesley College, Massachusetts. She co-founded, and subsequently floated, The Pelican Group Plc, owner of a number of restaurant chains including Café Rouge. She also served as CEO of Spirit Group from 1999 to 2006, which was later purchased by Punch Taverns. She was appointed Chancellor of the University of East Anglia in 2016.

Already Commander of the Order of the British Empire (CBE), she was appointed Dame Commander of the Order of the British Empire (DBE) in the 2022 Birthday Honours for services to business and the hospitality industry.

References

1956 births
Living people
British businesspeople
Wellesley College alumni
Alumni of the University of East Anglia
Dames Commander of the Order of the British Empire
Chancellors of the University of East Anglia